The 2014–15 Northern Kentucky Norse men's basketball team represented Northern Kentucky University (NKU) during the 2014–15 NCAA Division I men's basketball season. The Norse, led by 11th-year head coach Dave Bezold, played their home games at The Bank of Kentucky Center and were members of the Atlantic Sun Conference (A-Sun). They finished the season 13–17, 7–7 in A-Sun play to finish in a tie for fourth place. Due to their transition to Division I, the Norse were ineligible to participate in NCAA-operated postseason play, specifically the NCAA tournament and NIT, and will remain ineligible for those tournaments until the 2016–17 season. However, they were eligible for the A-Sun tournament where they lost in the quarterfinals to Lipscomb.

This proved to be the final season of both Bezold's tenure at NKU and the school's membership in the A-Sun. Following the season, Bezold was fired, eventually being replaced by Alabama assistant John Brannen. Then, on May 11, 2015, it was announced that NKU would leave the A-Sun to join the Horizon League effective July 1, 2015.

Roster

Schedule and results
Source:

|-
!colspan=9 style=| Non-conference regular season

|-
!colspan=9 style=| Atlantic Sun regular season

|-
!colspan=9 style="background:#000000; color:#FFD700;"|Atlantic Sun tournament

References

Northern Kentucky Norse men's basketball seasons
Northern Kentucky
Northern Kentucky Norse men's basketball
Northern Kentucky Norse men's basketball